New Town Eagles Soccer Club is a football (soccer) club which represents New Town in the Tasmanian Southern Championship. The club also fields teams in all junior divisions. New Town Eagles play their home games at Clare Street, in New Town.

The club began life as White Eagle, who proudly represented the Polish migrant community in Tasmania. Many Poles came to Tasmania immediately after World War II to seek a new life and better conditions following the devastation of the war. Many Poles who came to Tasmania found good jobs on the dangerous but well paid giant dam-building schemes of the then "Hydro-Electric Commission" (now Hydro Tasmania). These new migrants brought many of their traditions with them from home, one of which of course was football.

White Eagle was formed in 1961, and enjoyed immediate success, winning the KO Cup in their first year.
White Eagle first entered the Southern Premier League in 1964, although some of their players may have previously represented the failed Hydro side which played in the competition from 1955 until 1957. The team entered the top tier of the southern competition after winning the first division in only their second season of existence in 1963.

Throughout their history White Eagles drew strongly from the migrant Polish community, and this has continued after being forced to change their name to New Town Eagles in 1997 when it was decided all Australian football clubs should end their ethnic affiliations.
As of 2006, New Town Eagles have  although less successful in the Southern Premier League, New Town Eagles have won the State Championship 8 times, making them equal second with Hobart Zebras on the all time winners list. They enjoyed a great run in the short lived Tasmanian State League in the late 1980s winning the competition from 1988 to 1991 every year.

Honours
State Championship: (8 times) 1977,1978,1988,1989,1990,1991,1995,1997
State Championship Runners-up: (5 times) 1968,1986,1994,1996, 2011
Southern Premierships: (3 times) 1977,1986,1989
Southern Premier Runners-up: (twice)1968, 2012
KO Cup Winners: (4 times) 1987,1989,1996,1997
Summer Cup Winners: (10 times)1974,1976,1977,1990,1991,1992,1994,1996,1997,2000
Summer Cup Runners-up: (9 times)1978,1986,1988,1989,1993,1999,2001,2002,2006
Cadbury Charity Cup Winners: (twice)1987,1991
Cadbury Charity Cup Runners-up: (twice)1992,1993
Cadbury Trophy Winners: (twice)1988,1994
Cadbury Trophy Runners-up: (5 times) 1978,1986,1989,1992,1993
DJ Trophy Winners: (once)1976
Falkinder and Association Cup Winners: (once)1968
Falkinder and Association Cup Runners-up: (once) 1969
Association Cup: (once) 1968

Current squad
Nationality given from place of birth

External links
 New Town Eagles – Facebook Page
 New Town Eagles – Official Website

Association football clubs established in 1961
Soccer clubs in Tasmania
1961 establishments in Australia
Polish sports clubs in Australia
Polish association football clubs outside Poland